A poisoner is someone who uses poison.

Poisoner may also refer to:

Books
“The Poisoners” , original name of a story by Edgar Wallace, first printed without ending in May 1912 as a magazine competition, but completed in The Just Men of Cordova under a new title.
The Poisoner, police novel by Gerald Cumberland 1921
The Poisoners, Matt Helm series novel

Film and TV
The Poisoner, 1912 short film with Irving Cummings